Momodou Lamin Jallow (born 17 September 1996) is a Gambian-born American professional footballer who plays as a forward for First League of RS club Ljubić Prnjavor, on loan from Borac Banja Luka.

Career
Born in Serrekunda, Jallow has played for Kalonji Soccer Academy and their youth team KSA PRO-PROFILE in the United Premier Soccer League. In 2018 he signed his first professional contract with Farul Constanța.

In 2019, he joined Dacia Unirea Brăila.

Personal life
Jallow came to the United States as a refugee from Serrekunda in The Gambia.

References

External links

Momodou Jallow at playmakerstats
Momodou Jallow at Sofascore
Momodou Jallow at livesoccertv

1996 births
Living people
American soccer players
Gambian footballers
Premier League of Bosnia and Herzegovina players
First League of the Republika Srpska players
FCV Farul Constanța players
AFC Dacia Unirea Brăila players
FK Borac Banja Luka players
FK Ljubić Prnjavor players
Association football wingers